Billy La Min Aye (born 22 March 1995) is a Burmese singer-songwriter of ethnic Pa'O-Karen descent. She gained recognition from competing in the second season of Myanmar Idol and finishing as the runner-up. Billy released her debut album Perseverant Soul on 3 March 2018.

Early life and education
Billy La Min Aye was born on 22 March 1995 in Taunggyi, Shan State, Myanmar to ethnic Pa'O-Karen parent Khun Billy Shwe and his wife Thein Thein Aye. Her father is an ethnic Pa'O and her mother is an ethnic Karen. She is the eldest daughter of two siblings, having a younger sister. She attended high school at Basic Education High School No. 4 Taunggyi and graduated from Taunggyi University with a degree in English.  She was interested in singing since childhood, the love of music was seeded in her when her father sent her to a Sunday school around the age of eight.

Billy worked as a former private school teacher and taught four skills in English to young children at a private education center in Taunggyi.

Music career

2017: Competing in Myanmar Idol and rising popularity
Billy started out on her music career as a contestant in Season 2 of Myanmar Idol, a televised singing competition. In the Myanmar Idol grand final, she competed with Thar Nge. With the voting results of the whole country, Thar Nge became the winner, she was placed in 1st runner-up. Since winning the 1st runner-up in Myanmar Idol, she engaged in shooting commercial advertisements, stage performances, and many concerts at various locations throughout Myanmar.

2018–present: Solo debut and activities

In 2018, Billy started endeavoring to be able to produce and distribute her first solo album. She launched her debut solo album "Perseverant Soul" on 3 March 2018.

Billy won the Shwe FM's 2018 "Most Requested Song Award" and Padamyar FM's 2018 "Most Requested Song Award" with "Tine Yin Thu Lay Kyun Ma", a song from her solo album.

On 1 February 2019, she released a single song called "February" MV on her Facebook page which earned 1 M views within 24 hours. Billy performed in the ceremony of the 2018 Myanmar Academy Award on 23 March 2019 in Yangon. Billy released her second solo album "Special One" on 19 May 2019.

Ambassadorships
Billy was appointed as an ambassador of Japan Myanmar Culture in 2018.

Discography

Solo albums
 Perseverant Soul (2018)
 Special One  (2019)

Singles
 February (2019)
 Daddy (2019)
 The Joker (ft.Mee No) (2019)
 Nga Chit Thu Yae Mway Nay (2019)
 Yay San Lay San (2020)
 Wait (2020)
 Pyee Sone Mae Yat (2020)

References

External links
 

1995 births
People from Taunggyi
People from Shan State
Burmese people of Karen descent
21st-century Burmese women singers
Participants in Burmese reality television series
Living people